This is a list of members of the Victorian Legislative Assembly from 1943 to 1945, as elected at the 1943 state election.

On 25 September 1945, a cross-party group of five United Australia members, two Country members and one Independent voted with Labor and two left-wing Independents to defeat the Dunstan Ministry. The end result, on 2 October 1945, was the swearing in of the Macfarlan Ministry and the calling of the 1945 election.

 Independent Nunawading MLA Ivy Weber resigned in July 1943 to contest the Division of Henty at the 1943 federal election. Labor candidate Bob Gray won the resulting by-election in September 1943.
 Country Party Waranga MLA Ernest Coyle died on 31 August 1943. Country Party candidate Wollaston Heily won the resulting by-election in October 1943.
 Country Party Lowan MLA Hamilton Lamb died on 7 December 1943 at a Japanese prisoner of war camp on the Burma Railway in Thailand. Official notification of his death did not reach Australia until 1 September 1944, nearly nine months later. Country candidate Wilfred Mibus won the resulting by-election on 4 November 1944.
 Country Party Rodney MLA William Dunstone died on 12 April 1944. Country Party candidate Richard Brose won the resulting by-election in June 1944.
 Country Party Bulla and Dalhousie MLA Reginald James died on 27 September 1944. Country Party candidate Leslie Webster won the resulting by-election in November.
 Labor Bendigo MLA Arthur Cook died on 10 April 1945. Labor candidate Bill Galvin won the resulting by-election on 26 May 1945.
 Labor Clifton Hill MLA Bert Cremean died on 24 May 1945. Labor candidate Jack Cremean, his brother, won the resulting by-election on 7 July 1945.
 Liberal Prahran MLA John Ellis died on 2 July 1945. Labor candidate Bill Quirk won the resulting by-election on 18 August 1945.
 Heidelberg MLA Henry Zwar announced on 8 October 1945 that he would not be an endorsed Liberal for the upcoming election and did not belong to the Liberal Party.

Sources
 Re-member (a database of all Victorian MPs since 1851). Parliament of Victoria.

Members of the Parliament of Victoria by term
20th-century Australian politicians